Vagrancy is a phenomenon in biology whereby an individual animal (usually a bird) appears well outside its normal range; they are known as vagrants. The term accidental is sometimes also used. There are a number of poorly understood factors which might cause an animal to become a vagrant, including internal causes such as navigatory errors (endogenous vagrancy)  and external causes such as severe weather (exogenous vagrancy). Vagrancy events may lead to colonisation and eventually to speciation.

Birds 

In the Northern Hemisphere, adult birds (possibly inexperienced younger adults) of many species are known to continue past their normal breeding range during their spring migration and end up in areas further north (such birds are termed spring overshoots).

In autumn, some young birds, instead of heading to their usual wintering grounds, take "incorrect" courses and migrate through areas which are not on their normal migration path. For example, Siberian passerines which normally winter in Southeast Asia are commonly found in Northwest Europe, e.g. Arctic warblers in Britain. This is reverse migration, where the birds migrate in the opposite direction to that expected (say, flying north-west instead of south-east). The causes of this are unknown, but genetic mutation or other anomalies relating to the bird's magnetic sensibilities is suspected.

Other birds are sent off course by storms, such as some North American birds blown across the Atlantic Ocean to Europe. Birds can also be blown out to sea, become physically exhausted, land on a ship and end up being carried to the ship's destination.

While many vagrant birds do not survive, if sufficient numbers wander to a new area they can establish new populations. Many isolated oceanic islands are home to species that are descended from landbirds blown out to sea, Hawaiian honeycreepers and Darwin's finches being prominent examples.

Insects 
Vagrancy in insects is recorded from many groups—it is particularly well-studied in butterflies and moths, and dragonflies.

Mammals 
In mammals, vagrancy has been recorded for bats, pinniped seals, whales, manatees, belugas, cougars, and more.

Reptiles 
Vagrancy has been recorded for sea turtles, snakes (e.g. Pelamis platura), crocodilians, and probably also occurs in lizards. It therefore seems to be a fairly widespread phenomenon in reptiles. Saltwater crocodiles are especially prone to vagrancy, with individuals occasionally being recorded in odd places including Fiji, Iwo Jima, and even the Sea of Japan.

Plants 
The term vagrant is also used of plants (e.g. Gleason and Cronquist, 1991), to refer to a plant that is growing far away from its species' usual range (especially north of its range) with the connotation of being a temporary population. In the context of lichens, a vagrant form or species occurs unattached to a substrate ("loose"), not necessarily outside its range.

Another definition (de Lange & Molloy, 1995) defined vagrant species in New Zealand flora – although could also be applied for any given region. Their definition was, "taxa whose presence within the New Zealand botanical region is naturally transitory... those which have failed to establish themselves significantly beyond their point of introduction through reproductive failure or for quite specific ecological reasons.". One example was the presence of Atriplex cinerea in New Zealand.

References 

Animal migration
Biology terminology
Ecology terminology
Phytogeography
Wayward animals